The Nitti I government of Italy held office from 23 June 1919 until 21 May 1920, a total of 333 days, or 10 months and 28 days.

Government parties
The government was composed by the following parties:

Composition

References

Italian governments
1919 establishments in Italy